Laedorcari is a genus of beetles in the family Cerambycidae, containing the following species:

 Laedorcari fulvicollis (Lacordaire, 1869)
 Laedorcari pubipennis (Fisher, 1952)
 Laedorcari vestitipennis (Zajciw, 1963)

References

Rhinotragini